Tangipahoa Parish School Board is a school district headquartered in Amite City, Louisiana, Tangipahoa Parish, Louisiana, United States.

The district serves Tangipahoa Parish.

Robert L. Frye (1927-2011), the Republican nominee for state education superintendent in 1972, was a former member of the Tangipahoa Parish School Board.

The Board has a long history of racial discrimination in the hiring of teachers. In 1975, it was ordered to ensure one-third of the teaching staff were Black. Both the Board and the Court ignored the mandate for more than thirty years. During the period from 1998 to 2008, the Board hired fewer Black teachers than any other school system in the state. In 2010, a second ruling strengthened the first.

In 1994, the Board adopted a requirement that a disclaimer be read aloud before any instruction on the theory of evolution. Local parents sued. In 2000, the Supreme Court declined to revise a lower court ruling striking down the policy.

School uniforms
All students are required to wear school uniforms.

Schools

See also 
 Freiler v. Tangipahoa Parish Board of Education

References

External links
 Tangipahoa Parish School System

School districts in Louisiana
Education in Tangipahoa Parish, Louisiana